The October 1917 Dublin University by-election was held on 5 October 1917. The by-election was held due to the incumbent Irish Unionist MP, Arthur Warren Samuels, becoming Solicitor-General for Ireland. It was retained by Samuels who was unopposed due to a War-time electoral pact.

References

1917 elections in the United Kingdom
October 1917 events
By-elections to the Parliament of the United Kingdom in Dublin University
Unopposed ministerial by-elections to the Parliament of the United Kingdom (need citation)
1917 elections in Ireland